Créteil-Pompadour is a railway station located in Créteil, Val-de-Marne, Paris, France. The station was opened on 15 December 2013 and is located on the Paris–Marseille railway. The station is served by Paris' express suburban rail system, the RER. The train services are operated by SNCF.

The station replaces the station Villeneuve-Prairie, with the new station serving the nearby Parc Interdépartemental des Sports.

Train services
The station is served by the following service(s):

Local services (RER D) Goussainville - St Denis - Paris - Villeneuve St Georges - Combs la Ville - Melun
Local services (RER D) Paris - Villeneuve St Georges - Juvisy - Évry Centre - Corbeil Essonnes
Local services (RER D) Creil - Orry la Ville - Gouissainville - St Denis - Paris - Villeneuve St Georges - Juvisy - Évry - Corbeil Essonnes

See also 

 List of stations of the Paris RER

External links

 

Railway stations in Val-de-Marne
Réseau Express Régional stations
Railway stations in France opened in 2013